ZIS may refer to:

 Zavod imeni Stalina; several enterprises in the former Soviet Union and its products trademarked as "ZiS"
 Zentrum für Internationale Studien der TU Dresden, School of International Studies of the Dresden University of Technology in Germany
 Zhuhai International School in Zhuhai, China
 Zurich International School in Zurich, Switzerland
 Zingiberene synthase, an enzyme